Blush Response is an American industrial techno project based in Berlin, Germany. It is the solo project of musician Joey Blush.

History
Blush Response is a project of American artist and sound designer Joey Blush.

He began Blush Response in New York City in 2009, and has released several albums to date, each album showing an evolution in sound.  His early worked touched on EBM and synth pop influences with vocals and pop structures.  After relocating to Berlin his sound evolved into a hybrid of instrumental techno, EBM, and industrial.

His music is characterized by a modular synth heavy approach to sound design, combining rough, glitch-heavy beats with thick, distorted synths to create a sound that blurs the lines between electronic genres.

Blush has also done programming work for artists such as Fear Factory, Rhys Fulber, and Cristian Castro, and has toured as a member of Joey Jordison (Slipknot)'s industrial metal project Scar the Martyr.

Discography

Studio albums

Singles

Extended plays

Remixes
Dangerous Muse - I Want It All (Blush Response Remix)
TENSE - Disconnect Myself (Blush Response Remix)
Fear Factory - Blush Response (Difference Engine Remix)
iVardensphere  - Bonedance (Blush Response Remix)
Batillus - Cast (Blush Response Remix)
Pouppée Fabrikk - H8 U (Blush Response Remix)
How to Destroy Angels - How Long (Blush Response Remix)
Mindless Self Indulgence - Fuck Machine (Blush Response Remix)
3Teeth - Master of Decay (Blush Response Remix)
Front Line Assembly - Echogenetic (Blush Response Remix)
Delerium feat. Phildel - Ritual (Blush Response Remix)

References

External links
The official Blush Response site
Blush Response's Official Facebook page
Blush Response on Soundcloud
Blush Response on Discogs

American industrial music groups
Musical groups from New York City
Musical groups established in 2009